Banger racing is a tarmac, dirt, shale and chalk track type of motorsport event popular in countries such as the United Kingdom, Ireland, Belgium and the Netherlands. Vehicles are raced against one another, with the winner being the first to the checkered flag after a set number of laps. Contact to damage an opponent's car is permitted and encouraged within the formula, with cars progressively becoming more damaged throughout an event. Banger racing is often confused with stock car racing, although there are differences between the two, despite often racing at the same tracks.

Vehicles
Banger racing vehicles are normally scrap or 'written-off' cars in varying states of disrepair. In modern bangers, there are different events held for different vehicle types.

The most common type are 'Unlimited' bangers, where cars racing have no set engine size limit. Despite the high running costs, this is usually one of the most competitive classes and is favoured by most drivers because of the high speeds and car strengths. Fans often regard the unlimited class as the sport's pinnacle, with many big championship races being raced to unlimited class specs.

The 'Under 2000cc' class is where cars have to have an engine under two litres in size, a formula that proves to be particularly popular with Ford variant cars such as the Mondeo and the Cougar. As these types of cars are used so often, some promotions have taken to limiting the 'Under 2000cc' class even more, by running races with additional car constraints that force drivers to use alternative vehicles to the favoured Fords.

'Under 1300cc-1800cc', also known as 'Domestic bangers', are another regular class of bangers seen in the UK, with the engine displacement cap varying on the track or promotion that is holding the event. The domestic class is most common in the 'Rookie' and 'Back to Basic' formats.

'Micros' are the smallest vehicle class used in the banger racing and usually feature cars such as the Ford Ka and the Nissan Micra, that are generally considered to be too small or uncompetitive to compete in the other classes. Micros have quickly become one of the most popular forms of banger racing, due to the cheap running and repair costs of the cars compared with the bigger machinery.

Four-wheel drive cars cannot be raced in any of the above categories. The 'Unlimited' class has the main stipulation of the car being rear-wheel drive, unless the vehicle is of American origin. This ruling makes it quite flexible for drivers to choose an appropriate car to race in, however there are some car models which have been banned outright for their increased strength compared to other vehicles. This is mainly to keep competition fair and not to endanger drivers who may be racing in weaker cars. The SsangYong Rodius and the Chrysler Imperial are two of the most prominent to have been banned for these reasons.

Many other banger classes exist, but many are only applied for special event meetings. Big or small van, HGV/coach/bus, 4X4/SUV, siamese/double-decker and classic car ('Pre' meeting) bangers are all classes that would incorporate vehicles one may not normally be allowed to race in the regular disciplines listed above.

History and turnouts

Banger racing is said to have started in the early 1960s after it was observed by a race promoter that crashes were among the most popular features of a race meeting. Drivers began turning out vehicles with very basic preparation - cars would have the windows removed but often whole interiors would be left inside. Safety regulations began to improve in the 1980s with bangers being prepared with compulsory 'H frame' roll cages, driver's door plates, and fuel tanks moved inside the car.

The sport has become a leading formula in short oval racing in the UK and Ireland, regularly drawing large numbers of both competitors and spectators. As the sport's popularity exploded during the 1970s and 1980s, many venues began to host banger events, building a strong driver and fan base in the process. These tracks and promotions began to host championship events to find out their fastest and most talented drivers. PRI was the first promotion to do so, holding their first World Final in 1971 at Harringay Stadium.

The Spedeworth Unlimited Banger World Final was another of these big championship events and is now the oldest championship event still running. The first title race was held in October 1974 at Wimbledon Stadium. Plough Lane was the venue for this annual event until 2007 when changes to London traffic laws meant it had to be relocated. From 2008 the meeting was relocated to Ipswich and has continued to thrive, attracting more drivers than the Wimbledon World Finals were able to facilitate.

Around the late 1980s and early 1990s, promoters began hosting 'open' meetings with significant prize funds and very little regarding car limitations; the first of these being held was Ringwood Raceway's 'British Open' and the Arena Essex 'Firecracker 500'. Meetings like these continued to grow over the coming years, producing more cars and attracting drivers from all over the UK and often overseas. The 'Firecracker' event held at Arena Essex was so popular that it became the venue's biggest meeting for fans and drivers alike, and was subsequently held every year until the stadium's closure in 2018.

The peak number of cars to compete in one season was around 13,000 in 2003, of which around 9,500 were 'fresh' and had not been raced at any previous meetings.

As for individual meetings, the largest turnouts vary depending on the banger class racing. Meetings with 200+ bangers in attendance would be considered some of the biggest in the sport's history.

The largest accurate meeting turnout on record was the Spedeworth Unlimited National Banger World Final of 2017 in which 269 cars were in attendance. The 'Heavy Metal Classic' meetings hosted at Standlake, are the only ones to come close to this figure with a turnout of 266 at the 2005 running and 265 cars the following year, however both of these meetings consisted of 'Unlimited' and 'Under 1800cc' bangers.

Banger team meetings have also become popular in recent times, producing turnouts of over 200 cars on some occasions. The Unlimited 'Icebreaker' meeting, held at Swaffham Raceway on 8 February 1998 drew 209 competitors. Not only was this event the first of its kind to break this barrier, but at the point of running, it was the largest accurate turnout on record. Since then, there have been many other team meetings that have produced 200+ turnouts. The biggest team meeting on record was the Unlimited teams event held at Oval Emmem in 2016, which produced a turnout of 240 cars, also making it the biggest turnout at any Dutch venue.

Another turnout of significance in the sport is the 2013 Olly Moran Memorial weekend held at Arena Essex in 2013. This meeting holds the record for being the biggest 'one-make' turnout in the sport's history, as every driver in attendance had to race either a 'Mark I' or 'Mark II' variant of the Ford Granada. This meeting achieved a turnout of 232 over the two days, with the Sunday running of the event becoming one of the community's most highly regarded meetings.

The final landmark meeting worth mention is the 2018 Stan Woods Memorial meeting at Stoke which turned out a total of 192 cars. This meeting was special for the reason that the event consisted only of cars which started production before 1975, making it the largest ever classic car meeting turnout. What makes this meeting all the more special, is that the turnout grew each year from the creation of the event back in 2012, however since event moved to Odsal Stadium, the limited pit space means these numbers are unlikely to be repeated.

Racing

Banger racing within the UK is usually held to one of three rule presets that consist of varying degrees of contact during races. 'National' banger racing is the only one which is full-contact. Drivers are allowed to pull off aggressive hits like 't-bones', 'head ons', 'follow ins' and 'jack ups' that are not allowed in other types of banger racing. Meetings held to National rulings are very popular and usually more destructive than any other.

'Rookie' banger racing is a format designed to prolong the life of driver's cars with limited contact between drivers. The idea was brought about in the mid-1990s for those wishing to race bangers across the course of a season on a small budget. The reduced costs and crashes mean it is a safer and less aggressive environment for drivers, but not as popular with fans. The 'Rookie' banger format is commonly seen as a stepping stone for drivers who are looking to step up to the 'National' banger scene, with many drivers stepping up or partaking in both throughout their careers.

'Back to Basic' banger racing is an emerging part of the banger world, that is growing in success and popularity by acting as an entry level way for fans to break into the sport. Racing is often held in the same style as the 'Rookie' banger division, but car preparation is scaled back, with drivers being able to leave in dashboards and on-key ignition, that would normally have to be removed. Drivers are also not allowed to protect their vehicles as much, with cars usually being stripped-down versions of how they appeared on the road. This is currently seen as the cheapest and easiest way to race bangers and harks back to the sport's roots of simple preparation and large grid sizes.

A banger race is distinct from a demolition derby, as the objective of the latter is not to turn laps, but to smash, destroy and ultimately immobilise all of the opposition, until only one vehicle is left. On occasions, though, the final event at a 'National' or 'Back to basic' Banger meeting may be a demolition derby where the cars that have raced compete to be the last one standing. At special events, caravans or small boats may be towed by racers during the demolition derby for added destruction during the event.

At regular banger events, cars are gridded across the track, sometimes in a graded order of driver success, and then sent away to give a rolling start for the beginning of a race.

Despite the racing element of the sport, the community often categorise drivers into two different groups. There are those who are regarded as 'rodders', a term derived from the Hot Rod formulas that also commonly race on short ovals. These drivers aim to win races by any means possible. There are also those who are known as 'wreckers' and compete with the intention of destroying their own and other racer's cars. Wreckers are often more popular with the crowd, although drivers who win races and qualify for the world final are also respected.

Along with trophies for race winners and podium finishers, there are often trophies presented to the 'Best wrecker', 'Best entertainer' and 'Demolition derby winner', in order to attract drivers of both persuasions. Another trophy often given is a 'best car' award which is usually either given to the best-presented vehicle or the rarest car; with the latter being the subject of much controversy with classic car enthusiasts.

In a banger race, yellow flags are used during the race to warn drivers that caution is required. Cars which stall or are stopped by opposing drivers are usually left on the course while the race continues. In recent times, drivers have been encouraged to remain inside a disabled car while the race continues, as this is adjudged to be the safest option. The largest association of European promoters has indeed mandated this, it is now a punishable offence to leave a car during 'green flags' unless deemed an emergency situation. If it is deemed necessary to move them or if a driver is in particular danger (including fire), a red flag may be used to stop the race. Races are then usually restarted when the situation has been cleared.

Critics
Some vehicle enthusiasts object to banger racing, claiming it is responsible for the destruction of classic cars and the reason why many models, such as the Austin Westminster, have become rare. The banger community maintain that a large percentage of vehicles raced are beyond restoration.

See also 
 Figure 8 racing – A similar sport raced in the US
 Demolition derby – A 'last man standing' event popularised in the US and commonly used to close banger race meetings
 Folkrace – A similar sport raced in Finland and Scandinavian countries
 Mouldy Old Dough – Widely regarded as the theme tune for National banger racing

References

External links

Governing bodies
 Official website of the Oval Racing Council International
 Official website of the National Stock Car Association
Race Promoters
 Official website of Autospeed Short Oval Motor Racing
 Official website of CAMSO
 Official website of DMC Race Promotions
 Official website of Incarace
 Official website of Spedeworth
 Official website of Stratrax Oval Racing
 Official website of Trackstar Racing
Independent venues
 Official website of Barford Raceway
 Official website of Buxton Raceway
 Official website of Cowdenbeath Racewall
 Official website of Crimond Raceway
 Official website of Oval Emmem
 Official website of Grimley Oval Raceway
 Official website of Lochgelly Raceway
 Official website of Mendips Raceway
 Official website of Mildenhall Stadium (Owned by Spedeworth)
 Official website of Ringwood Raceway
 Official website of Skegness Stadium
 Official website of Standlake Arena
 Official website of Stansted Raceway
 Official website of Swaffham Raceway
 Official website of Warton Stock Car Club

Auto racing by type

fr:Stock-car#Véhicules usagés